"Pease Porridge Hot" or "Pease Pudding Hot" is a children's singing game and nursery rhyme. It has a Roud Folk Song Index number of 19631.

Lyrics
The lyrics to the rhyme are:

Pease porridge hot, pease porridge cold,
Pease porridge in the pot, nine days old;
Some like it hot, some like it cold,
Some like it in the pot, nine days old.

Origin
The origins of this rhyme are unknown. The name refers to a type of porridge made from peas. Today it is known as pease pudding, and was also known in Middle English as pease pottage. ("Pease" was treated as a mass noun, similar to "oatmeal", and the singular "pea" and plural "peas" arose by back-formation.)

The earliest recorded version of Pease Porridge Hot is a riddle found in John Newbery's Mother Goose's Melody (c. 1760):
Pease Porridge hot,
Pease Porridge cold,
Pease Porridge in the Pot
Nine Days old,
Spell me that in four Letters?
I will, THAT.

Where the terms "pease pudding" and "pease pottage" are used, the lyrics of the rhyme are altered accordingly.

Game

Schoolchildren often play Pease Porridge Hot by pairing off and clapping their hands together to the rhyme as follows:
Pease (clap both hands to thighs) porridge (clap own hands together) hot (clap partner's hands),
pease (clap both hands to thighs) porridge (clap own hands together) cold (clap partner's hands),
Pease (clap thighs) porridge (clap own hands) in the (clap right hands only) pot (clap own hands),
nine (clap left hands only) days (clap own hands) old (clap partner's hands).
(Repeat actions for second stanza)
NOTE: The actions are performed during recitation of the word or phrase, not following.

Notes

References
Miller, Olive Beaupré. In the Nursery of My Bookhouse. Chicago: The Bookhouse for Children Publishers (1920).
Whitmore, William H. The Original Mother Goose's Melody, as First Issued by John Newbery, of London, About A.D., 1760. Albany: Joel Munsell's Sons (1889).
Wollaston, Mary A. (compiler). The Song Play Book: Singing Games for Children. New York: A.S. Barnes and Company (1922).

Children's games
Clapping games
Singing games
English nursery rhymes
English folk songs
Traditional children's songs
Year of song unknown
Songwriter unknown